Laurent Escurat is a paralympic athlete from France competing mainly in category T37 sprints events.

Laurent competed in the 2000 Summer Paralympics in both the 100m and 200m before taking part in both relays winning a silver medal with the French 4 × 400 m relay team for category T38 athletes.

References

External links 
 

Paralympic athletes of France
Athletes (track and field) at the 2000 Summer Paralympics
Paralympic silver medalists for France
French male sprinters
Living people
Medalists at the 2000 Summer Paralympics
Year of birth missing (living people)
Place of birth missing (living people)
Paralympic medalists in athletics (track and field)
20th-century French people
21st-century French people